Wa'el Hamza Julaidan (kunya: Abu al-Hasan; born 22 February 1958 in Medina, Saudi Arabia) is one of the original founders of al-Qaeda in August 1988.

He had previously (1984) established "the Service Office" or Maktab al-Khidamat  in Afghanistan, along with bin Laden and Abdullah Yusuf Azzam. Many of the supporters of al-Qaeda were trained in the Afghan military camps this trio set up in support of the mujahideen resistance movement against the Soviet occupation.

He was the president of the Tucson Islamic Center from 1984 to 1985. In 1986 he left Tucson to fight the Soviet invasion of Afghanistan. In 1987, he traveled to Hijaz, and was expected to return to Karachi.

For his suspected role in al-Qaeda, Julaidan was placed under worldwide embargo by the United Nations, in 2002.
His UN embargo was lifted in 2014.

References

Al-Qaeda founders
Saudi Arabian al-Qaeda members
Living people
1958 births
People from Medina